Palpita hyaloptila is a moth in the family Crambidae. It was described by Turner in 1915. It is found in Australia, where it has been recorded from Queensland.

Adults have translucent wings with brown spots.

References

Moths described in 1915
Palpita
Moths of Australia